The Set Up is a 2019 Nigerian crime thriller film directed by Niyi Akinmolayan. The film stars Dakore Akande, Adesua Etomi and Kehinde Bankole in the lead roles. The plot of the film is based on a young woman who drops her childhood innocence as she delves to become a criminal for survival. The film was released on 9 August 2019 and received mixed reviews and was also criticised for too much plot twist and turns in the screenplay. Despite the mixed reception, the film became a success at the box office. It was also streamed via Netflix on 22 April 2020.

Plot 
Two women, Grace (Kehinde Bakole) and Chike (Adesua Etomi), best friends, eventually become drug dealers in order to survive. Chike being a drug smuggler receives money and drugs more than what she bargained and is dragged into a series of deceiving traps when she is hired by socialites Edem (Jim Iyke) and Madame (Tina Mba) to marry a wealthy heiress (Dakore Akande).

Cast 
 Dakore Akande as heiress
 Adesua Etomi as Chike
 Kehinde Bankole as Grace
 Jim Iyke as Edem
 Tina Mba as Madame(Enitan)
 Joke Silva
 Ayoola Ayolola
 Uzor Arukwe

Production 
The film marked the seventh feature film directorial venture for Niyi Akinmolayan after Kajola, Make a Move, Falling, The Arbitration, The Wedding Party 2 and Chief Daddy. The film also marked second collaboration between director Niyi and writer Chiza Onuzo after The Wedding Party 2 and the film was produced under the banner Inkblot Productions, marking its 10th film. The portions of the film were predominantly shot in Lagos. The official trailer of the film was unveiled on 3 July 2019. The film was premiered at the FilmHouse Cinemas in Lagos on 4 August 2019.

References

External links 
 

2019 films
2019 thriller drama films
2019 crime drama films
2019 crime thriller films
English-language Nigerian films
Nigerian crime drama films
Nigerian crime thriller films
2019 LGBT-related films
Nigerian LGBT-related films
LGBT-related drama films
LGBT-related thriller films
Films directed by Niyi Akinmolayan
2010s English-language films